The 1999 NAIA football season was the component of the 1999 college football season organized by the National Association of Intercollegiate Athletics (NAIA) in the United States. The season's playoffs, known as the NAIA Football National Championship, culminated with the championship game on December 18, at Jim Carroll Stadium in Savannah, Tennessee.

Conference and membership changes

Conference changes
 This was the final season for the North Dakota College Athletic Conference. The conference's six remaining members, all from North Dakota, would join with four South Dakota-based members of the South Dakota-Iowa Intercollegiate Conference to form the Dakota Athletic Conference for the 2000 season. At its dissolution, the NDCAC had sponsored football for seventy-seven seasons, beginning in 1922.
 This was also the final season for the South Dakota-Iowa Intercollegiate Conference. After the end of play, the SDIIC's remaining members joined either the new Dakota Athletic Conference (with former members of the NDCAC) or the existing Nebraska-Iowa Athletic Conference (which would subsequently rebrand as the Great Plains Athletic Conference). The SDIIC and its predecessor, the South Dakota Intercollegiate Conference, had sponsored football for eighty-two seasons, beginning in 1917.

Conference standings

Postseason

Rankings

References